Station, is an Armenian drama television series. The series premiered on ATV on September 26, 2016. Since then, the series air every workday after another TV series called If I Find You at 23:00 in Armenia and at 8:00 pm in California.
Mostly, the series takes place in Yerevan, Armenia.

References

External links
 

Armenian drama television series
Armenian-language television shows
2010s drama television series
ATV (Armenia) original programming
2016 Armenian television series debuts
2010s Armenian television series